Thadomal Shahani Engineering College (TSEC) is a private engineering college in Mumbai, India. Founded in 1983, it is the first and the oldest private engineering institute affiliated with the University of Mumbai.

TSEC was founded by the Hyderabad (Sind) National Collegiate Board (HSNC Board) in the year 1983. It is named after one of Mumbai's most respected philanthropists, Dada Kishinchand T. Shahani's father, Thadomal Shahani.

History of the Board 
The HSNC board is a charitable trust established by the Sindhi Community in 1922. It currently manages and administers over 27 institutes under its umbrella. 

The board was managing the National College in Hyderabad, Sindh long before the partition of India. After the Partition of British-India into two countries in 1947, the members of the Sindhi-Hindu Community migrated to India. Vidyasagar Principal K.M. Kundnani, with the vision and mission to promote participation in education, initiated the efforts for starting a college in Mumbai.

With active support and encouragement from one of Bombay's influential Barrister H.G. Advani, the HSNC Board came into existence in 1949 at Bandra, Mumbai. The Late Barrister became the Founder-President, whereas Vidyasagar Principal K.M. Kundnani was the made the Founder-Secretary and Founder-Principal of the first college started by the board, R.D. National College, Bandra, Mumbai.

Courses 
The college was the first engineering college affiliated to the University of Mumbai to start the following course:
Bachelor of Engineering in Chemical Engineering (1983),Electrical Engineering (1983),Computer Engineering (1984), Information Technology (1998), Biomedical Engineering (1983) and Biotechnology (2004)
Artificial intelligence and Data science (2020).
 Master of Engineering in Computer Engineering (2001)
 Doctor of Philosophy(Ph.D.) in Information Technology

History 
Approved by the Directorate of Technical Education of Maharashtra on 16 September 1983, TSEC is one of the oldest private engineering colleges of India and was among the first institutes in the country to offer undergraduate level studies in specializations of computer engineering, information technology and biomedical engineering. The Department of Biomedical Engineering is one of the oldest in India and was set up in 1983. The first batch of Computer Engineering graduates passed out in 1988. The undergraduate course in Information Technology was started in 1998. The departments of Electronics & Telecommunication Engineering as well as Chemical Engineering were established in the year 1983, whereas that of Biotechnology was established in the year 2004.

At the desktop of achievements of the institute lies the starting of the Ph.D. program by the University of Mumbai in the department of Information Technology.

Governing council
The institute is currently presided by Dr. Niranjan Hirandani, Managing Director of Hiranandani Constructions. Indu Shahani, Director of Academics at Hyderabad (Sind) National Collegiate Board is responsible for enhancing the academic standards of all the institutes managed by the trust, including Thadomal Shahani Engineering College.

Kishu H Mansukhani is a trustee and past President of the Board. Members of the Board are Anil Harish, who is also a past President of the Board, Maya Shahani, and Akhil Shahani.

Academic departments
 Artificial Intelligence & Data Science
 Computer Engineering
 Information Technology
 Electronics & Telecommunication Engineering
 Biomedical Engineering
 Chemical Engineering
 Biotechnology
 Mathematics and Statistics
 Physics
 Humanities
 Chemistry

The college is developed up to doctorate level and offers a Doctor of Philosophy Programme (Ph.D.) in Information Technology discipline and a Full-Time two-year master's course i.e. Master of Engineering (ME) in Computer Engineering for which it has 25 seats. TSEC offers a four-year Bachelor of Engineering (BE) course in Artificial Intelligence & Data Science, Computer Engineering, Chemical Engineering, Electronics, and Telecommunication Engineering, Information Technology, Biomedical Engineering, and Biotechnology. Its active student community hosts branches of several professional societies including Rotaract Club, NSS, ACM, CSI, ISTE, IETE, IIChE, etc.

Apart from these, TSEC also has departments of Mathematics, Physics, Chemistry, Humanities, Civil and Mechanical, which have supporting roles and conduct foundation courses for various degree programs.

The department of Mathematics stresses subjects including but not limited to algebra, geometry, differential calculus, integral calculus, statistics, and probability theory.

The department of Humanities at TSEC stresses heavily on communication skills, soft skills, presentation techniques, body language, and vocational skills.

Campus

The TSEC Campus is located at Linking Road in the Bandra suburb of Mumbai and is within a few kilometers radius from the National Stock Exchange of India as well as the business center Bandra Kurla Complex.

The Old Building has six stories and is host to the departments of Chemical Engineering, Biomedical Engineering and Biotechnology with all the requisite laboratories and classrooms; an Engineering Drawing Hall with a capacity of 70 and 2 reading rooms with a capacity of 30 each.

The New Building has eleven stories and is host to the departments of Computer Engineering, Information Technology and Electronics and Telecommunication Engineering with all the requisite laboratories and classrooms; a reading lounge with a capacity of 80 and a workshop with a capacity of 100 students.

Library: TSEC has a spacious library having more than 31,674 technical books. The library subscribes to national/international journals/ periodicals/magazines. Currently, there are subscriptions to 122 magazines, including national and international journals. The college has also joined e-resources (International Journals) through INDEST / SD – AICTE consortium essentially to facilitate academic research on the campus.

Seminar Hall: It has two seminar halls with audio-visual systems and having a capacity of 125 seats each.

Sports and Recreation: The institute has a small sports room with indoor games such as Table Tennis, Carrom, and Chess or video games like Clash of Clans Private Server. The Basketball court of R. D. National College is accessible to students of TSEC. The institute also has a tie-up with the adjacent Khar Gym Khana sports club for college festivals and additional sports facilities such as Cricket, Soccer, Swimming, Lawn Tennis, etc.

Professional societies
TSEC-MIC (Media, Information, and Communication)

This is the official social media cell of the institution which had laid its grounds in January 2019. The cell is responsible for handling the official social media handles and press releases. The cell aims to bring out students' extra-curricular skills, apart from the excellent academic records. The students may choose to enter the photography, design, or content & editorial team, based on their interest. TSEC is active on leading social media platforms like Instagram (www.instagram.com/tsec_official) and Facebook (www.facebook.com/tsec.edu/).

IETE-TSEC

It is a student branch of the Institution of Electronics and Telecommunication Engineers-Mumbai Branch. IETE-TSEC is the fastest-growing committee of Thadomal Shahani Engineering College. It arranges techo-fun fests like ELAN and OSCILLATION which includes events and workshops namely ethical hacking, coding competitions, circuit builder, robotics competition+workshop, and fun events like glow cricket, FIFA, and Mini-Militia. Their past sponsors include Mumbai City FC, Honda, JioSaavn, RAAIF, Box8, and Endeavour. In December, IETE-TSEC arranges an annual Industrial Visit.

TSEC Students' Council

It is a student body of the college that overhauls the working of the cultural events. It is the core committee associated with the principal. 'Trifles' is one of the largest engineering cultural festivals held in Mumbai, which the TSEC Students' Council hosts every academic year. The auditions for national-level Street Play, Dance, Drama, and Fashion Show Teams are held by the Students' Council. The intra-level festival Avalanche, Traditional Day, Leadership Meet, and BE Farewell are also planned and organized by this committee that pledges to make sure that enjoyment and opportunities are guaranteed to each individual.

TSEC Sports Committee

It is the sole body responsible for encouraging various athletes, sportspersons, and enthusiasts. The inter-collegiate festival "Yudh" has been hugely successful in making its mark amongst the best sporting events in Mumbai. The massive participation that this event receives explains its popularity in and outside the college. Also, Invictus is the intra-level festival that the Sports committee organizes. In this event that unites every branch as the students across the four years vie for the best branch trophy and budding sportspersons are given recognition. The TSEC football, cricket, basketball badminton, throw ball, carom, and chess teams that involve both girls and boys are managed by this committee

MS TSEC

The Management Society is one of the oldest and largest student societies in TSEC. MS-TSEC hosts three major festivals every year. With three clubs dedicated to quizzing, literary activities, and debating respectively, MS-TSEC is the only society of its kind in Mumbai University. MS-TSEC hosts three major festivals, CARMA, Speaktacular, and Lakshya every year. The Industrial Visit organized by this body is the apt combination of visiting well-established industries and fun at various locations in the country.

It is the largest student body of the Institute of Electrical and Electronics Engineers (IEEE) in Mumbai. The IEEE-TSEC chapter's technical team called "Conatus" has won various competitions in Mumbai. It organizes the annual national level technical festival of TSEC called ISAAC which boasts of a variety of robotics and non-robotics contests, workshops, conferences, and exhibitions. IEEE also has four of its chapters active in TSEC namely Computer Society, Communication Society, Engineering in Medicine and Biology Society, and Industrial Electronics Society

CSI-TSEC

It is the student branch that comes under the Computer Society of India – Mumbai chapter. Every year, CSI – TSEC conducts student activities including workshops, seminars, conferences, technical competitions, training programs, and industrial visits. In 2011, its annual festival 'RUBIX', had participants from many countries for the coding event 'Codezilla' making it the first event in TSEC to go global.

ISTE-TSEC

The Indian Society for Technical Education - TSEC Chapter aims at upbringing the technical knowledge of the Engineering Students; deliver various successful workshops, seminars, and competitions. The annual inter-college festival of ISTE-TSEC is called ASCENT.

IEI - TSEC

It is the TSEC chapter of the Institution of Engineers (India), the national organization for engineers in India which has over 0.5 million members from 15 engineering disciplines in 99 centers or chapters in India and overseas.

NSS-TSEC

It is the TSEC chapter of the National Service Scheme and is one of the non-technical societies of the institute which has been involved in many social activities. Major of these activities are Blood Donation Drive and Bandra Station Project. NSS-TSEC also conducts a 10 Day Residential Camp in the outskirts of Mumbai with the basic aim of overall development of the Society.

IIChE-TSEC

It is the TSEC chapter of the Indian Institute of Chemical Engineers, India's apex chemical technical society, and conducts seminars, research paper presentations, industrial visits with a vision of integrating textbook learning with industrial knowledge. The society conducts its Annual Technical festival - Chemergence which draws participants from the whole of India.

RC-TSEC

The Rotaract Club of TSEC, founded in 2016. RCTSEC has multiple events in every avenue which brings a large crowd from the college as well as other colleges in Mumbai. A few of their events include Open-Mic, Futsal, PawRangers and Walkathon.

Rankings

In 2009, TSEC was ranked #28th in a list of top 50 private engineering colleges of India by Mint. It was ranked at #41 among the top 50 private engineering colleges of India by Indian magazine The week.

Notable alumni
Atul Khatri, Indian Comedian
Sachin Khedekar, Indian Actor

References

External links

Engineering colleges in Mumbai